Jackson Alexander Irvine (born 7 March 1993) is an Australian professional soccer player who plays as a midfielder for 2. Bundesliga club FC St. Pauli. He has previously played for Celtic, Kilmarnock, Ross County, Burton Albion, Hull City and Hibernian. Irvine played for Scotland at under-19 level, but subsequently played for the Australia national team and was selected in their 2018 and 2022 FIFA World Cups squads.

Club career

Celtic
Irvine was born and raised in Melbourne, Australia, where he attended The Knox School. and where he played for clubs in the Victorian League structure. While growing up, Irvine met Curtis Good when "they were both ten and lived two minutes from each other and grew up together". They also "ran cross countries together, played for Knox City (in Melbourne) as juniors". He won the Frankston Pines player of the year award in 2009, his first season of senior football.

He signed with Celtic in December 2010 after a successful trial period. During the 2011–12 season, Irvine played for Celtic in the NextGen Series, a pan-European competition for youth teams, he also captained the under 19-side that won the Scottish Youth Cup and Under-19 League that season. Irvine also won the Youth Cup in 2010–11 and 2012–13. He made his Scottish Premier League debut on 1 September 2012, when he came on as a half-time substitute in a 2–2 draw against Hibs. Having made his first team debut he also captained the club's new under-20 side.

Kilmarnock (loan)
At the start of the 2013–14 season, Irvine joined Scottish Premiership side Kilmarnock on a six-month loan following interest from manager Allan Johnston.

Two days after signing for the club, Irvine made his debut, in a 1–1 draw against St Mirren. Irvine then went on to earn regular playing time in the starting eleven. After making six appearances at the club, Irvine scored a "stunning strike from a short Barry Nicholson free-kick" in a 2–0 victory over Ross County on 19 October 2013, giving Johnston his first win for Kilmarnock since arriving at the club as manager. Several weeks later, on 9 November 2013, Irvine was sent-off for receiving a second bookable offence, in a 3–1 loss against St Johnstone. In January 2014, Irvine's loan spell with Kilmarnock was extended until the end of the season.

Ross County
On 1 September 2014, Irvine was sent out on loan again, this time to Ross County. He made his debut on 13 September 2014, in a 2–1 home defeat against Motherwell. On 28 July 2015, Ross County signed Irvine on a two-year permanent deal from Celtic for a development fee.

Burton Albion
On 15 July 2016, Irvine signed for English Championship club Burton Albion for a reported fee of £330,000, with the club saying they had broken their transfer record to sign him. He made his debut for the club on 13 August against Bristol City. Three days later he scored his first goal, helping Burton Albion beat Sheffield Wednesday 3–1. This marked the start of a run of four goals in his first six league games for the club. Irvine was named Burton's Player of the Year for 2016–17 after scoring 10 goals in 43 games and helping the club to avoid relegation.

Hull City

On 30 August 2017, Irvine signed a three-year deal with Hull City. On 8 September 2017, he made his debut for the club when he came off the bench after 70-minutes to replace Jon Toral in a 5–0 away loss to Derby County.
On 9 December 2017, Irvine scored his first goal for the club when he netted Hull's final goal in
a 3–2 home win against Brentford.

Irvine was released by Hull City in June 2020.

Hibernian
On 12 January 2021, Irvine joined Scottish side Hibernian until the end of the 2020–21 season.

St. Pauli

On 5 July 2021, Irvine signed for German club FC St. Pauli.

International career

Irvine represented Scotland at the under-19 international level, although he said in October 2011 that he was still interested in playing for Australia. Irvine was eligible to play for Scotland because his father was born in Aberdeen, although he reiterated his desire to play for his native Australia in September 2012. On 11 October 2012, he made his debut for the Australia under-20 team in a friendly match against Portugal.

In September 2013, Irvine received his first Australia senior national team call-up and was selected for two matches. After being on the bench for one game, Irvine made his debut coming on as a substitute for Mile Jedinak in the 83rd minute, in a 3–0 win over Canada on 15 October 2013.

In May 2018, he was named in Australia's 23-man squad for the 2018 World Cup in Russia.

In November 2022, he was named in his second World Cup squad, and was named in the starting team of the opening match against France as a right midfielder.

Career statistics

Club

International

Scores and results list Australia's goal tally first, score column indicates score after each Irvine goal.

Honours
Ross County
Scottish League Cup : 2015–16
Recognised by Casemiro 
Individual
Scottish Premiership Player of the Month: March 2016
Burton Albion Player of the Year: 2016–17

See also
List of sportspeople who competed for more than one nation

References

External links

 Aussie Footballers Iandorio to Istuk 

Living people
1993 births
Australian people of Scottish descent
Australian soccer players
Association football midfielders
Australia international soccer players
Scotland youth international footballers
2017 FIFA Confederations Cup players
2018 FIFA World Cup players
2019 AFC Asian Cup players
Melbourne Victory FC players
Celtic F.C. players
Kilmarnock F.C. players
Ross County F.C. players
Scottish Premier League players
Soccer players from Melbourne
Scottish Professional Football League players
English Football League players
Frankston Pines F.C. players
Burton Albion F.C. players
Hull City A.F.C. players
Hibernian F.C. players
FC St. Pauli players
Australian expatriate soccer players
Australian expatriate sportspeople in Scotland
Expatriate footballers in Scotland
Australian expatriate sportspeople in England
Expatriate footballers in England
Australian expatriate sportspeople in Germany
Expatriate footballers in Germany
2022 FIFA World Cup players